Massachusetts House of Representatives' 4th Plymouth district in the United States is one of 160 legislative districts included in the lower house of the Massachusetts General Court. It covers part of Plymouth County. Democrat Patrick Kearney of Scituate has represented the district since 2019.

Towns represented
The district includes the following localities:
 Marshfield
 part of Scituate

The current district geographic boundary overlaps with that of the Massachusetts Senate's Plymouth and Norfolk district.

Former locales
The district previously covered:
 Halifax, circa 1872 
 Pembroke, circa 1872

Representatives
 Henry Blanchard, circa 1858 
 Peter Salmond, circa 1859 
 John Quincy Adams Lothrop, circa 1888 
 Elwin Temple Wright, circa 1920 
 Martha Ware, circa 1951 
 John R. Buckley, circa 1975 
 Frank Hynes 1983–2009
 James Cantwell
 Patrick Joseph Kearney, 2019-current

See also
 List of Massachusetts House of Representatives elections
 Other Plymouth County districts of the Massachusetts House of Representatives: 1st, 2nd, 3rd, 5th, 6th, 7th, 8th, 9th, 10th, 11th, 12th
 List of Massachusetts General Courts
 List of former districts of the Massachusetts House of Representatives

Images
Portraits of legislators

References

External links
 Ballotpedia
  (State House district information based on U.S. Census Bureau's American Community Survey).
 League of Women Voters Plymouth Area

House
Government of Plymouth County, Massachusetts